is a Japanese professional shogi player ranked 9-dan. He is also currently the senior managing director of the Japan Shogi Association.

Early life
Waki was born on August 10, 1960, in Osaka, Japan. He learned shogi at a shogi class taught by shogi professional , and in 1975 he was accepted into the Japan Shogi Association's apprentice school under the guidance of Takashima at the rank of 5-kyū. He was promoted to the rank of 1-dan in 1977, and obtained full professional status and the rank of 4-dan in October 1978.

Shogi professional
Waki became the 48th professional to win 600 official games when he defeated Masahiko Urano on February 3, 2015.

In March 2019, Waki voluntarily declared himself as a free class player, thus leaving the Meijin tournament league.

Theoretical contributions
Waki is known for his innovations in the Yagura opening, and the Waki System is named after him.

Promotion history
The promotion history for Waki is as follows:
 5-kyū: 1975
 1-dan: 1977
 4-dan: July 16, 1979
 5-dan: April 1, 1983
 6-dan: April 1, 1984
 7-dan: October 1, 1990
 8-dan: November 16, 2000
 9-dan: April 1, 2021

Titles and other championships
Waki has yet to appear in a major title match, but he has won three non-title championships during his career. He won the  once (1983), and the  twice (1984 and 1985).

Awards and honors
Waki received the JSA's "25 Years Service Award" in recognition of being an active professional for twenty-five years in 2004, and the "Shogi Honor Award" in recognition of winning 600 official games as a professional in 2015. He also received the Japan Shogi Association's “Masuda Special Prize” Annual Shogi Award for the 20192020 shogi year.

JSA director
Waki was selected to be the senior managing director of the Japan Shogi Association's board of directors for a two-year term at the association's 70th General Meeting on June 7, 2019, and reelected to a second two-year term in June 2021.

Personal life
Waki is married to professional Go player Masako Araki.

References

External links
ShogiHub: Professional Player Info · Waki, Kenji

Japanese shogi players
Living people
Professional shogi players
People from Osaka
Professional shogi players from Osaka Prefecture
1960 births